I Remember Nelson is a British historical television series portraying the relationship between Horatio Nelson and Emma Hamilton in the period leading up the Battle of Trafalgar. It first aired in four parts on ITV between 21 February and 18 April 1982.

Selected cast
 Kenneth Colley as Vice-Adm. Horatio Viscount Nelson
 Tim Pigott-Smith as  Capt. Thomas Hardy
 Geraldine James as Lady Emma Hamilton
 John Clements as Sir William Hamilton
 Michael Harbour as Captain Blackwood
 Raf Vallone as Caracciolo
 Paolo Bonacelli as  King Ferdinando
 Harriet Reynolds as  Queen Maria Carolina 
 Vernon Dobtcheff as Cardinal Ruffo
 Peter Clapham as  Diplomat
 Una Brandon-Jones as Nurse
 Tina Ruta as  Emma's Maid
 Phil Daniels as William Blackie
 Anna Massey as Lady Frances Nelson
 Daniel Massey as William Beckford
 Ken Kitson as Mangan
 Laurence Naismith as Rev. Edmund Nelson
 Sylvester Morand as  Lord Byron
 John Forbes-Robertson as Lord Spencer
 Mike Edmonds as Pirate

References

Bibliography
 Sue Parrill. Nelson's Navy in Fiction and Film: Depictions of British Sea Power in the Napoleonic Era. McFarland, 2009.

External links
 

ITV television dramas
1982 British television series debuts
1982 British television series endings
1980s British drama television series
1980s British television miniseries
Television series by ITV Studios
Television shows produced by Central Independent Television
English-language television shows